Philiris albiplaga is a species of butterfly of the family Lycaenidae. It is found on the Schouten Islands (Biak and Mefor).

References

Butterflies described in 1916
Luciini
Taxa named by James John Joicey
Taxa named by George Talbot (entomologist)